The Seven Fuqaha of Medina is the title of seven Muslim scholars who were the largest contributors as to the transmission of hadith and making of fatwas in Medina during the 2nd century AH:

 Sa'id ibn al-Musayyib
 'Urwah ibn Az-Zubayr ibn al 'Awwam
 Salim Ibn 'Abdullah ibn 'Umar
 Qasim ibn Muhammad ibn Abi Bakr
 Abu Salama ibn Abdur Rahman bin Awf
 Sulayman ibn Yasar
 Kharijah ibn Zayd ibn Thabit| Zayd Ibn Thabit]].

Some scholars include Abu Bakr ibn Abd ur-Rahman ibn al-Harith, and Ubaydullah ibn Abdillah ibn Utbah ibn Mas'ud instead.

See also
 The Four Companions
 The Seven People of the Cave
 Jafar al Sadiq

External links 
  Text about The Seven Fuqaha of Medina by Shaykh Muhammad Abu Zahrah (extract of Mâlik, Hayâtuhu wa 'Asruhu, Arâ°uhu wa Fiqhuhu)
  Presentation and biography of the Seven Fuqaha of Medina (at-tawhid.net)

References

8th-century Islam